This page lists the World Best Year Performance in the year 2007 in the men's decathlon. The main event during this season were the 2007 World Championships in Osaka, Japan, where the competition was held at the Nagai Stadium on Friday August 31 and Saturday September 1.

Records

2007 World Year Ranking

See also
2007 Décastar
2007 Hypo-Meeting

References
decathlon2000
IAAF
apulanta

2007
Decathlon Year Ranking, 2007